José Víctor Martínez Díaz (born 18 March 1991) is a Chilean footballer who currently plays for Deportes Santa Cruz.

Honours

Club
Universidad Católica
 Primera División de Chile (1): 2010
 Copa Chile (1): 2011

San Marcos de Arica
 Primera B de Chile (1): 2012

Coquimbo Unido
 Primera B de Chile (1): 2014

References

External links

1991 births
Living people
Chilean footballers
Chilean Primera División players
Primera B de Chile players
Club Deportivo Universidad Católica footballers
San Marcos de Arica footballers
Everton de Viña del Mar footballers
Coquimbo Unido footballers
Deportes Magallanes footballers
Unión San Felipe footballers
Puerto Montt footballers
Association football defenders
Chile international footballers
People from Curicó